Vladimir Borisovich Kurnev (born 12 September 1950) is a Belarusian professional football coach and a former player. He works as youth coordinator with FC Minsk.

As a player, he spent the majority of his career in Dinamo Minsk, also spending a few seasons in Pakhtakor Tashkent and Lokomotiv Moscow.

References

External links 
Profile at pressball.by

1950 births
Living people
Footballers from Riga
Soviet footballers
Belarusian footballers
FC Dinamo Minsk players
Pakhtakor Tashkent FK players
FC Lokomotiv Moscow players
Belarusian football managers
Expatriate football managers in Moldova
Expatriate football managers in Russia
Expatriate football managers in Lithuania
FC Fandok Bobruisk managers
FC Dinamo Minsk managers
FC Darida Minsk Raion managers
FC Slavia Mozyr managers
FC Dynamo Brest managers
FC Neman Grodno managers
FBK Kaunas managers
FC Veras Nesvizh managers
FC Partizan Minsk managers
Association football midfielders